The 2018–19 Kerala Premier League Season was the sixth season of the Kerala Premier League. The season featured 11 teams which was divided into 2 groups and is played on a home-and-away format. The season kicked off on 16 December 2018. Kozhikode Quartz, SBI Kerala and Trikaripur withdrawn from the league due to financial problems.

Teams

Central Excise, Cochin Port Trust and Kerala Police are pulled out from the 2018–19 season. Golden Threads, RFC Kochi, Kovalam FC along with Indian Navy were added making 2018–19 season a 11-team affair.

Stadiums and locations

Head coaches

Foreign players
Clubs can sign maximum four players of any nationality but only three is allowed in the playing eleven.

Results

Group A

Fixtures and results
Source: fanport
 Cancelled Matches

Group B

Fixtures and results
Source: fanport

Knockout stage

Fixtures and results
Semi-Finals

Final

Season statistics

Scoring

Top scorers

References

Kerala Premier League seasons
Kerala Premier League